Olena Leonidovna Lukash is a Ukrainian former jurist, politician, former Minister of Justice of Ukraine, as well as a former member of the Party of Regions. She was a Merited Jurist of Ukraine (2010).

From February 2014, Lukash was wanted for charges of murder and mass complicity in the Revolution of Dignity when President Yanukovych fled to Russia.
 She is believed to have fled to Russia in the aftermath of the Revolution of Dignity. From then she was also placed on an EU sanctions list. From June 2015 Lukash was also wanted on abuse of office and fraud charges. On November 5, 2015, the Security Service of Ukraine arrested Olena Lukash upon her return to Kyiv from Russia, and a court was opened to file charges against her. However on November 10, she was released on bail of over 5 million Hryvnia after she claimed   that she deliberately had gone to the Prosecutor General’s Office of Ukraine to give evidence for an investigation into the deaths of over a hundred people in the Revolution of Dignity. In 2020, it was alleged that Lukash was currently hosting a program and guest-appearing on pro-Russian channels owned by Viktor Medvedchuk, as part of a wider Russian disinformation campaign against Ukraine.

Life and career

Born on November 12, 1976, in Rybnitsa, Moldavian SSR, Lukash lived in Severodonetsk since 1977. She graduated from the Academy of Labor and Social Relations at the Trade Union Federations of Ukraine in 2000.

In 2001, she received a certificate to conduct jurist activities and in 2001–03 directed a company "Agency "In the Name of Law" (Агентство "Іменем Закону"). In 2004–05 Lukash was a senior instructor at the Ukrainian academy of foreign trade and later the Jurist Agency "Libera". In 2005 she defended several participants of the "Severodonetsk Congress".

From 2006 to 2012, she was elected to the Verkhovna Rada. During that time Lukash was a People's Deputy of Ukraine and the First Deputy Minister of the Cabinet of Ministers. In 2010–11 she was the First Deputy Chairman of Presidential Administration and represented the President of Ukraine in the Constitutional Court of Ukraine. In December 2012 Lukash was appointed the Minister of Cabinet of Ministers.

On July 2, 2013, Oleksandr Lavrynovych was elected as member of the Supreme Council of Justice of Ukraine. Lukash replaced Lavrynovych as Justice Minister 2 days later.

Family
Her younger sister Tetyana, Merited Jurist of Ukraine (2010), is a member of the Central Election Commission of Ukraine.

Lukash's husband Lieutenant General Hryhoriy Ilyashov is a former director of the Foreign Intelligence Service of Ukraine. He was replaced in late June 2014.

Sanctions

Listed in the List of people sanctioned during the Ukrainian crisis

References

External links
 Handbook "Who is who in Ukraine". "KIS Publishing"
 Lukash's page at the Verkhovna Rada website
 Profile at the Government website
 Interview at "Ukraine the Criminal"

1976 births
Living people
People from Rîbnița
Party of Regions politicians
Women government ministers of Ukraine
Fifth convocation members of the Verkhovna Rada
Sixth convocation members of the Verkhovna Rada
Cabinet Office ministers of Ukraine
Justice ministers of Ukraine
Pro-government people of the Euromaidan
Ukrainian prisoners and detainees
Prisoners and detainees of Ukraine
Female justice ministers
21st-century Ukrainian women politicians
Russian individuals subject to European Union sanctions
Recipients of the Honorary Diploma of the Cabinet of Ministers of Ukraine
Women members of the Verkhovna Rada